Pyrausta quadrimaculalis is a moth in the family Crambidae. It was described by Paul Dognin in 1908. It is found in Argentina.

Taxonomy
The name quadrimaculalis is preoccupied by Pyrausta quadrimaculalis described by South in 1901.

References

Moths described in 1908
quadrimaculalis (Dognin, 1908)
Moths of South America